The 7th Minnesota Infantry Regiment was a Minnesota USV infantry regiment in the Union Army that served in the Western Theater of the American Civil War. Elijah Evan Edwards was one of the chaplains of the 7th Minnesota Infantry. Oliver Perry Light was another, promoted to Full Chaplain on 16 Apr 1863.

Service

The 7th Minnesota Infantry Regiment was mustered into Federal service at Camp Release, Fort Snelling, and St. Peter, Minnesota, between August 16 and October 30, 1862. In August Companies A, B, F, G, and H marched to relieve the embattled Fort Ridgely.  They would see action at the Battle of Birch Coulee and at the Battle of Wood Lake in September.  Following the surrender of the Sioux, the Seventh spent the winter in Minnesota. The next summer, they accompanied Colonel Henry Sibley against the native peoples in Dakota Territory. They fought in the Battle of Big Mound in July, 1863.  They returned to Minnesota to be sent south to St Louis in October for the winter. Once spring arrived, the regiment moved east to Paducah, Kentucky. From there, it headed south into Tennessee and by the end of June were in northern Mississippi. In July, they fought Confederate forces in the Battle of Tupelo. They pursued Sterling Price but did not engage his troops. They arrived in Nashville that winter and contributed to the Union victory at the Battle of Nashville. After the battle, they moved further south into Alabama for the Battle of Spanish Fort, one of the last battles on the Western theater. The war ended and by July the Seventh was heading north for home.  The Regiment was mustered out in St. Paul, Minnesota, on August 16, 1865.

 Casualties

The 7th Minnesota Infantry suffered 2 officers and 31 enlisted men killed in action or who later died of their wounds, plus another 138 enlisted men who died of disease, for a total of 171 fatalities.

Colonels
Both of the 7th regiment's commanders were later elected governor of Minnesota:
 Colonel Stephen Miller – August 24, 1862, to November 6, 1863.
 Colonel William Rainey Marshall – November 6, 1863, to August 16, 1865.

Further reading 

 Collins, Loren Warren. Memorandum of Sibley's expedition, 1863. Diary (June 16-September 11) while on march with the Sibley Expedition as part of the 7th Minnesota Infantry Regiment, Company F.
Collins, Loren Warren. Sketch of Sibley's expedition [of] 1863 (April 4, 1888). Published as "The expedition against the Sioux Indians in 1863, under Gen. Henry H. Sibley," a pamphlet printed by the St. Cloud Journal-Press, St. Cloud, Minnesota, 1895.
Diary of Sibley Expedition (June 16-August 27, 1863) by unidentified soldier in 7th Minnesota Infantry while on march through western Minnesota and the Dakota Territory as far west as the Missouri River.

References

External links
 The Civil War Archive
 Minnesota Historical Society page on Minnesota and the Civil War

See also
List of Minnesota Civil War Units

Units and formations of the Union Army from Minnesota
1862 establishments in Minnesota
Military units and formations established in 1862
Military units and formations disestablished in 1865